Polyglucan is any polysaccharide that contains glucan units. Specifically, polyglucan's are a structural polysaccharide. The basic polyglucan unit consists of a long linear chain of several hundred to many thousands D-glucose monomers attached with a type of covalent bond called, glycosidic bonds. The point of attachment is O-glycosidic bonds, where a glycosidic oxygen links the glycoside to the reducing end sugar. Polyglucans naturally occur in the cell walls of bacteria. Bacteria produce this polysaccharide in a cluster near the bacteria's cells. Polyglucan's are a source of beta-glucans. Structurally, beta 1.3-glucans are complex glucose homopolymers binding together in a beta-1,3 configuration.

Types
The following are beta glucans

Function
Polyglucans are utilized as a carbon source for microbial fermentation. Although polyglucan production has so far been promoted by nutrient limitation, it must be further enhanced to accommodate market demand. The combined strategies of cultivation design and genetic engineering are used for polyglucan productivity for bioethanol production.
Polyglucans are also involved in another sector of the energy industry, acting as biopolymers to increase oil recovery. The polysaccharide is attached to the bacteria cells and then mixed in an alkali solution such as sodium hydroxide to become soluble. After which, it is then pumped into the injection well. The reason it needs to be a fluid is so you can pump the polysaccharides into the reservoir, but then the polysaccharide needs to gel/solidify/precipitate in situ upon addition of another chemical in order to plug up the pore. The biopolymer is then combined and injected with water until it fills up at least 30% of the empty pores. Next, there is an injection of an acid solution or  forming . This neutralizes the solution and allows for the precipitation of the biopolymer, polyglucans, inside the high-permeability zones. Evidence shows that the application of this polyglucan can reduce the permeability of approximately 80% of the high-permeability zones. Oil companies are able to benefit from the decreased permeability because oil tends to flow in areas with the highest permeability. They can also serve as dietary supplements.

Synthesis

Photosynthetic microorganisms, such as cyanobacteria and microalgae, are currently used for their polyglucan production. Since these organisms have high-photosynthetic activity and whole-year cultivation without utilization of arable land. The cultivation is done by modifying the nutrient supply and replacing the growth medium of the cyanobacteria and green microalgae since the control and manipulation of polyglucan metabolism necessitates the elucidation of the polyglucan production mechanism. These activities promote the growth of polyglucans from these organisms.

Clinical significance
The immune-modulation action of polyglucans has been known for over 40 years, after experiments showed that they stimulated the activation of macrophages through the activation of the complement system. The detection of the (1,3)-β-D-glucan in blood is also used as a means of identifying invasive or disseminated fungal infections. Although, a positive test does not render a diagnosis, and a negative test does not rule out infection. This test can aid in the detection of Aspergillus, Candida, and Pneumocystis jirovecii.

References 

Polysaccharides